Sergison is a surname. Notable people with the surname include:

Charles Sergison (1655–1732), MP for New Shoreham 1698–1702
Thomas Sergison (1701–1766), MP for Lewes 1747–1766
Bertram Sergison-Brooke (1880–1967), British Army officer